The Irish Free State (Agreement) Act 1922 (12 & 13 Geo. 5 c. 4) was an Act of the British Parliament passed on 31 March 1922. It gave the force of law to the Anglo-Irish Treaty, which was scheduled to the Act.

Main provisions

Section 1(1) of the Act provides that: 
 the "Articles of Agreement for a Treaty between Great Britain and Ireland set forth in the Schedule to this Act shall have the force of law from the date of the passing of this Act".

Section 1(2) provided that for the purposes of giving effect to Article 17 of the Treaty:
 the British Government could by Orders in Council transfer powers to the Provisional Government of Southern Ireland;
 the Parliament of Southern Ireland would be dissolved within four months from the passing of the Act; and
 elections would be held for "the House of the Parliament" to which the Provisional Government would be responsible. The Act did not give a name to that Parliament but said that in matters within the jurisdiction of the Provisional Government (i.e. only certain matters concerning Southern Ireland), it would have power to make laws in like manner as the Parliament of the Irish Free State when constituted.

Sections 11 and 12 provided for the right of Northern Ireland to opt out of the new dominion and remain within the United Kingdom.

Effect and repeal

Notably, the Act (under Section 1(5) of the Act) was stated explicitly not to be the Act of Parliament for the ratification of the Anglo-Irish Treaty. That function was to fall to the Irish Free State Constitution Act 1922. Instead, the Act was primarily intended to provide interim provisional arrangements necessary before the establishment of the Irish Free State, which under the Treaty had to be established on or before 6 December 1922.

By Order in Council under the Act, the British Government formally transferred powers to the existing Provisional Government on 1 April 1922. That government had constituted itself on 14 January 1922 and had since chosen Michael Collins as its chairman. Their ministerial appointments now became official and were announced in Iris Oifigiúil No.19 of 4 April 1922.

The Irish Free State (Agreement) Act 1922 and the Irish Free State Constitution Act 1922 were repealed by the Statute Law (Repeals) Act 1989, Schedule 1, Part III.

References

External links
Text of the Act (HistoricalDocuments.org.uk)

1922 in law
United Kingdom Acts of Parliament 1922
British constitutional laws concerning Ireland
Political history of Ireland
1922 in Ireland
Ireland and the Commonwealth of Nations
Irish Free State
Repealed United Kingdom Acts of Parliament
Acts of the Parliament of the United Kingdom concerning Ireland
Constitutional laws of Northern Ireland